Little Skootamatta Creek is a creek in the Moira River and Lake Ontario drainage basins in Hastings and Lennox and Addington Counties in Ontario, Canada. The river's name is thought to come from Ojibwa words meaning "burnt shoreline".

Course
It flows southwest and flows under Ontario Highway 41, passing through several unnamed lakes and taking in several unnamed tributaries, including one from the right from Jacksons Lake. From that point, Ontario Highway 7 runs parallel to the creek. The creek continues southwest, is crossed by a Hydro One transmission line, and passes into Tweed, Hastings County. The Skootamatta River flows via the Moira River into the Bay of Quinte on Lake Ontario at the location of Belleville.

See also
List of rivers of Ontario

References

Rivers of Hastings County
Rivers of Lennox and Addington County